Steven H. Kaplan is an American academic and university administrator. He was a professor of English, and since 2004 is the president of the University of New Haven.

References

Living people
University of New Haven faculty
Colorado State University faculty
People from Chicago
University of California, Los Angeles alumni
University of Tübingen alumni
University of New Haven people
University of Virginia's College at Wise people
People from Branford, Connecticut
Year of birth missing (living people)